Ptomaphila is a genus of carrion beetles in the tribe Silphini. It contains the following species:

Ptomaphila lacrimosa Schreibers, 1802
Ptomaphila ovata Portevin, 1926
Ptomaphila perlata Kraatz, 1876

References

Silphidae